Texas State Highway Spur 10 (Spur 10) is a spur route in the U.S. state of Texas that remains within Fort Bend County. The highway begins at State Highway 36 (SH 36) near Pleak and runs in a northwesterly direction until it ends at SH 36 northwest of Rosenberg. Northbound traffic on SH 36 can use Spur 10 to avoid passing through Rosenberg. The highway goes entirely through rural areas.

History
On September 26, 1939, Loop 10 was designated to run from SH 114 to SH 121 in Grapevine in Tarrant County via Dallas Road as a renumbering of either SH 114 Loop or SH 121 Loop. Loop 10 was canceled on April 25, 1960 and removed from the highway system in exchange for the creation of Spur 103.

From that point, the spur ran southeast to end at what is now Future Interstate 69/U.S. Route 59 (US 59).

Route description
Spur 10 begins at a stop sign on SH 36 in Pleak. There is a Chevron filling station and market on the corner. From its starting point, Spur 10 heads straight northwest  to a bridge over Future I-69/US 59 and the Union Pacific Railroad tracks. This stretch of the highway is named Gerken Road near Pleak, but as it goes northwest it becomes known as Hartledge Road. Traffic on Spur 10 can access Future I-69/US 59 to the northeast by a feeder road and to the southwest by a ramp off the overpass. From Future I-69/US 59, the highway continues northeast about  where it turns to the north. Traffic on Spur 10 can access US 90A in both directions. From the overpass, the highway continues in a northerly direction for an additional  before ending at a stop sign on SH 36. In the stretch from Future I-69/US 59 to SH 36, the highway is also known as Patton Road and falls within the city limits of Rosenberg.

Major intersections

References

10
Transportation in Fort Bend County, Texas